Jack "Kid" Wolfe, (June 11, 1895 – April 22, 1975) was an American professional boxer. He was the first World Champion in the Junior Featherweight division. During his career he had no decision newspaper victories over reigning bantamweight champions Johnny Ertle, Joe Lynch, Kid Williams and Pete Herman, and fought future lightweight champion Sammie Mandell.  Wolfe also fought the talented boxers Frankie Jerome, 1918 world bantamweight champion "Memphis" Pal Moore, Young Montreal, Pete Zivic, Dick Loadman, Al Shubert, John "K.O." Eggers, Terry Martin, Danny Frush and Eddie O'Dowd.

Early life and career

Wolfe was born in Russia on June 11, 1895, according to his hometown paper, The Cleveland Leader. As a sideline, in his youth and early boxing days, Wolfe worked selling newspapers, like many great boxers of the era. Turning professional in 1911, the 5' 2" Wolfe, who was managed by Tommy McGinty and the very capable Jimmy Dunn, fought mostly as a bantamweight in the Cleveland area. One of his local rivals was Cal Delaney, whom he met three times in close fights early in his career.

By 1913, Wolfe started venturing out to New York City and other cities, to take on more nationally known battlers. A few of the men he met in New York City were Kid Herman, Willie Doyle, and Eddie O'Keefe.  By late 1916, he was back fighting mostly in Cleveland and averaging one fight per month. Local promoters did not hesitate to put him on a card, as he was an active fighter who "gave it  his all.

On December 11, 1915, Wolfe defeated talented southpaw Johnny Eggers, in a five-round disqualification at the Fairmont Athletic Club in the Bronx.  Wolfe had previously beaten Eggers in a newspaper decision of February 8, 1913 in New York City.

Early career bouts with Al Shubert and Dick Loadman, 1917-18

In a well publicized match on January 22, 1917, Wolfe defeated Al Shubert in Baltimore in a fifteen-round points decision.  In a close, but exciting match, many in the crowd believed Shubert, future holder of the New England Featherweight title, should have won by a shade. From the eleventh through the fifteenth, Wolfe had the cleaner punches, and they were sufficient to tip the judges' decision in his favor.  Wolfe's switch from uppercuts to head shots with his right in the later rounds, opened Shubert to blows from his left and subsequent combinations.  Wolfe succeeded best in the twelfth through fifteenth, where he secured his tight margin of victory.  He was an underdog against the more aggressive Shubert and made a showing that extended his reputation West of the Buckeye State.

On March 2, 1917, Wolfe defeated Dick Loadman in an important fifteen round points decision at the Monumental Theatre in Baltimore.  Wolfe had the better of ten rounds, one was even, and Loadman led in only four.  Jack boxed with great science, and the match was a speedy one throughout.  Loadman was the harder hitter, but Wolfe used ducking and side-stepping to effectively dodge his blows, usually causing them to fall wide of their mark. In the first six rounds, Wolfe suffered a consistent body attack, but in the remaining rounds, showing greater endurance, he grew stronger, and more effectively took the fighting to Loadman. Jack used his right cross to counter many of Loadman's advances, and was particularly effective with his left jab.  Loadman fought many of the best bantams of the era, but had a poor record against them.  Many reporters ringside felt Wolfe had the skills to soon face Pete Herman, bantam champion, but it would be weeks before a match could be arranged.  Loadman would lose to Wolfe again in both 1918 and 1919.  In their October 7, 1918 bout in Cleveland, Wolfe won in a ten-round newspaper decision of the Pittsburgh Post.  Showing versatility, Wolfe used uppercuts and short arm jolts to repel the infighting of Loadman, who had expected a long range attack by Wolfe. Wolfe was credited with six rounds.  In their January 6, 1919 bout, Wolfe defeated Loadman in a ten-round newspaper decision in Detroit.  One reporter wrote, "it was Wolfe's fight all the way", though both boxers remained on their feet throughout.  One source wrote that Loadman landed three blows to Dickman's one.

On March 12, 1917, Wolfe defeated Italian featherweight Terry Martin in Baltimore in a fifteen-round bout.  The fighting was fierce and described as "sensational".  Martin was said to have given a valiant showing in the ring.  On May 30, 1921, Martin would win a close twelve round bout on a judge's decision in Rhode Island against Wolfe.  Wolfe would lose to Martin again in a twelve-round newspaper decision in Jersey City on February 5, 1923.  Martin took the lead from the opening rounds.  In an awkward bout, Wolfe was wary of Martin and unable or unwilling to attack his defenses, while Martin scored far more punches than his opponent.  Martin would fight top talent in his career.  Martin's skill and two inch height advantage was a concern to Wolfe, who was particularly wary and sometimes awkward against taller boxers with longer reach.

Two victories over a bantamweight champion, Johnny Ertle, 1918

On January 5, 1918, Wolfe scored a ten-round win by newspaper decision over reigning World Bantamweight champion Johnny Ertle in Cleveland, Ohio.  Wolfe was the aggressor throughout the bout and most newspapers gave Wolfe six or seven of the ten rounds.  If the bout had been judged on points, as they are today, Wolfe would have taken the world bantamweight championship.  On December 7, 1917, Wolfe had previously defeated Ertle while he was reigning World Bantamweight Champion in a ten-round newspaper decision for a Soldier's benefit on December 7, 1917 in Wolfe's hometown of Cleveland. Ertle, who was content to fight from long range, was overcome by the short range attack of Wolfe, who in this rare instance had a three-inch reach advantage over his 4' 11" opponent.

Leonard fought Gussie Lewis to a draw on March 18, 1918 in a semi-final six-round newspaper decision in Philadelphia, according to the Philadelphia Public Ledger.

Three notable early career wins

Wolfe defeated British born featherweight Danny Frush at the Albaugh Theatre in Baltimore on March 27, 1918, in a fifteen-round points decision.  Despite Frush's five inch advantage in height, and considerable reach advantage, Wolfe persevered and won the match.

On January 20, 1919, Wolfe defeated fellow Russian-born Cincinnati-based Jewish boxer Sammy Sandow in a ten-round newspaper decision that was the main event at a boxing club in Cleveland. In a well publicized bout, the boxing was close.

Early in his career on February 6, 1919, Wolfe defefated Artie Root at Grey's armory in Cleveland in a ten-round newspaper decision.  The crowd of 10,000, was one of the largest ever jammed into the Armory.  Wolfe managed to dodge Root's strong right, and took the lead in the last six rounds, building a slight margin.  The win was a stepping stone for Wolfe's recognition as a bantam to watch.

Victory over reigning bantamweight champion Pete Herman, March, 1919

Wolfe defeated reigning bantamweight champion Pete Herman, on the evening of March 4, 1919, in a no decision non-title fight in Cleveland, Ohio, before a home audience.  Hundreds were turned away at the door of the packed house at Grey's Armory.  The Barre Daily Times gave Wolfe seven of the ten rounds, in a convincing victory.  Wolfe was considered the aggressor throughout the bout, with Herman given only two rounds by a slight margin.  The going was fast and furious, and a record breaking crowd attended the match.

Victory over world bantamweight claimant Jackie Sharkey, March, 1919

Wolfe beat 5' 3" Italian bantam Jackie Sharkey in a ten-round newspaper decision on March 24, 1919 at the Grand Theatre in Cleveland. According to the most newspapers, the bout was close, and Sharkey put up a valiant effort. Sharkey was a well known boxer who fought many great bantams of the era, but did not frequently win against them, and once unsuccessfully competed for the Jr. Lightweight Title in July 1922 against Johnny Dundee.  Sharkey claimed the World Bantamweight Title on August 15, 1919, in his bout with Pete Herman, though at the time there was some dispute over his claim, as boxing titles were not well regulated until years later.

Wolfe defeated Oklahoman Earl Puryear on December 29, 1919 in a ten-round newspaper decision in Cleveland.  Wolfe had defeated Puryear earlier that year on April 8, in a no decision ten round bout ruled a draw by the Warren Evening Mirror.  Puryear was a bantam with a good record who fought many great opponents including Johnny Buff, and champions Pete Herman and Kid Williams.

On April 20, 1920, Wolfe lost a newspaper decision to Charlie Beecher at the Arena in Syracuse, New York.  Wolfe attempted to score at close range, as was his habit, but Beecher clinched frequently preventing him easy access.  Few clean blows were scored by either boxer.  Wolfe's few clean blows were left jabs to the face of Beecher.  Beecher scored best to the body.  The final four rounds presented most of the action.  Some newspapers considered the bout a draw.

On January 23, 1920, Wolfe defeated top rated bantamweight Joe Burman in a ten-round newspaper decision in Buffalo, New York.  Wolfe, against an equally matched opponent, was able to connect with more punches and put more power into them than his rival in the close bout.  As in many other accounts of Wolfe, his defense was described as awkward, but adequate for the task.  Nonetheless, Burman scored with his left jab and right hook to the face of Wolfe on several occasions.  Wolfe had previous scored a draw and a win against Burman in newspaper decisions in their previous two bouts.  In their December 19, 1919 bout in Akron, Ohio, Wolfe won in a ten-round newspaper decision.  The fighting was close with both boxers wary of their opponent, and included frequent clinching.  Midway through the bout, Burman attempted to fight at long range, dancing to gain an angle of advantage, but Wolfe clinched and continued infighting to neutralize the threat.  With a two-inch disadvantage in height and reach, Wolfe was wise to prefer infighting rather than allowing Burman the advantage in long range attacks.

Wolfe defeated Eddie Pinchot in an eight-round newspaper decision in Rochester on January 24, 1921 despite a significant disadvantage in reach and height.  Wolfe used his wealth of experience and four pounds extra weight to gain the popular decision, landing a stinging blow to the eye of Pinchot with a right swing in the fourth.  Throughout the bout, and especially in the last two rounds, Wolfe fought aggressively and landed stronger blows than Pinchot.

Bouts with Pal Moore and Kid Williams, bantamweight champions

On May 3, 1920 Wolfe lost to disputed 1918 World Bantamweight Champion Memphis Pal Moore in Memphis, Tennessee in an eight-round points decision.  Moore, an exceptional opponent, fought bantamweight champion Joe Lynch ten times, but was unable to win a title match during the no decision era.  He never knocked out Lynch, as would be required in most states to take the title during Lynch's reign as bantamweight champion and was never granted a title match judged on points, which he could have won more easily.

It wasn't until April 21, 1921, that Wolfe really tasted defeat, as Danny Kramer, a southpaw from Philadelphia, put the ten count on him with a right to the jaw in the fifth of twelve rounds in Cleveland.  Both boxers weighed 120, within the Junior Featherweight limit.  Up until that point, Wolfe had defeated many of the top bantamweights and featherweights in the world, including several world champions in non-title bouts, and seemed nearly invincible.

On May 18, 1921, Wolfe defeated  Kid Williams, former bantamweight champion from 1914–17, at the armory in Cleveland, Ohio in a twelve-round match.  The bout was considered tame, as both accomplished bantamweights were cautious and aware of the power of their opponents.

Wolfe won a newspaper decision over Frankie Kaiser on June 14, 1922 in Cincinnati. A few newspapers considered the bout a draw, however.

Taking the junior featherweight world championship, September 1922

On September 21, 1922, Wolfe was matched with Joe Lynch, reigning World Bantamweight Champion, in New York's Madison Square Garden for the new weight division, World Junior Featherweight Title, winning in a fifteen-round bout. The weight limit for the new division was 122 pounds.  The match could not be for the World Bantamweight Championship, as Lynch was four pounds over the weight class limit.  It may have been Wolfe's most important victory as the fight was billed as a world championship, and Wolfe won his first and only title, though the New York State Athletic Commission did not recognize this weight class at the time.  By the 1970s the Junior Featherweight Class was revived and recognized worldwide.

The victory was a convincing win against one of Wolfe's most accomplished opponents, who according to New York City's The Evening World, was not adequately trained for the bout.  The World did give credit to Wolfe's spirited attack, defense and wide points margin.  A large percentage of Lynch's blows missed Wolfe, who put up a complete defense against nearly all the blows thrown by his opponent despite a considerable four inch disadvantage in reach.  Lynch persisted in his attempts at a knockout but Wolfe repeatedly proved capable in his defense.  Wolfe threw far more blows than Wolfe, but they lacked the steam to bring down his opponent.  In their five previous meetings, Wolfe had won three of the five contests, proving he had the skill to compete with the world champion.  In their two most recent meetings in 1919, the fighting was close and several newspapers gave the decision to Lynch.

On December 26, 1922, Wolfe lost to Jewish Canadian boxer Benny Gould, also a Russian immigrant, for the world or Canadian version of the Junior Featherweight Title in a ten-round mixed decision.  One judge voted for Wolfe but two dissented and voted for Gould.  Wolfe once again lacked two inches in reach against the 5' 4", Gould, who was also six years younger and had been fighting professionally for only around three years compared to Wolfe's hard fought eleven.

On February 1, 1923, Wolfe defeated Eddie O'Dowd in a twelve-round points decision in O'Dowd's hometown of Columbus, Ohio. Dowd was a capable bantam who fought top talent including Frankie Gennarro, Kid Chocolate, and Panama Joe Brown, but was not likely to have ever cracked the top five world ratings among bantamweights.

On April 21, 1923, Wolfe defeated one of his more talented opponents, Frankie Jerome, in a twelve-round bout at the Commonwealth Sporting Club in New York.  Jerome claimed to have broken his hand in their April bout.  Wolfe would draw with Jerome four months later in Columbus, Ohio.

Losses to future lightweight champion Sammy Mandell, 1922-3

On June 13, 1923, Wolfe lost to exceptional boxer Sammy Mandell in a twelve-round bout in Elmwood, Ohio. Wolfe used his right effectively in the bout but Mandell took the lead through most of the bout, and led comfortably by the end.  Several newspapers gave Mandell every round.  Wolfe had previously lost to Mandell in Kenosha, Wisconsin in October 1922, in a ten-round newspaper decision.  Mandell would later hold the World Lightweight Championship from 1926–30.

On July 30, 2923, Wolfe defeated exceptional bantamweight Pete Zivic in a brief, but very close six round points decision in Columbus, Ohio in which Zivic fought with great skill.

Loss of Junior featherweight title, Carl Duane, August, 1923
On August 29, 1923, Wolfe met Carl Duane in Long Island in defense of his Junior Featherweight title. Wolfe lost the 15-round decision. Duane was said to have led in every round, except the sixth when Wolfe attacked with a series of lefts and rights. Both men remained on their feet throughout the match, though Wolfe slipped in the fifth.  The fifth through seventh were action packed though Wolfe was at a disadvantage from the eighth round on, with Duane taking the lead.

On January 14, 1924, Wolfe defeated talented and prolific Jewish bantamweight Young Montreal, born Morris Billingkoff, in Columbus, Ohio in a twelve-round match.  A top bantamweight contender for ten years, Montreal would fight nine world champions a total of seventeen times.

In something of a comeback attempt on March 12, 1924 against Leroy "Kid" Roy, former and future holder of the Canadian Featherweight Title, Wolfe lost in a ten-round points decision in Montreal.  In his prime, Wolfe may have won the victory, but his years of ring experience had diminished his speed and technique.  At least in Canada, some reporters considered this bout for the world junior featherweight title, as Roy would take it two weeks later defeating Jewish boxer Benny Gould in Toronto.

Wolfe lost to fellow Cleveland bantamweight Carl Tremaine on July 28, 1924, in Cleveland, Ohio, in a first-round technical knockout.  Wolfe had suffered an auto accident before the bout, and his face showed the results.  After a brisk start to the bout, Tremaine landed a solid left on the face of Wolfe, and after a slight push, Wolfe sat down, and attempted to rise and was knocked down four more times, when the referee called the fight 2:58 into the first round.  Wolfe prematurely announced his retirement to the Dayton Daily News two days later, but would soon return to boxing after a one-year break.

Wolfe attempted a comeback against Franklin Cheek in Milwaukee on December 18, 1931.  He would lose in a six-round points decision and shortly after retire from boxing for the last time.

He was one of the most popular fighters in Cleveland history, and ended his career of 131 fights with 74 wins, 29 losses and 28 draws.  In his entire career, only around eleven of his wins were knockouts or technical knockouts, as he was never considered a particularly heavy hitter.  He died on April 22, 1975 at the age of 79.

Professional boxing record
All information in this section is derived from BoxRec, unless otherwise stated.

Official Record

All newspaper decisions are officially regarded as “no decision” bouts and are not counted in the win/loss/draw column.

Unofficial record

Record with the inclusion of newspaper decisions in the win/loss/draw column.

See also
List of super bantamweight boxing champions

Achievements

|-

References

External links
 Jack "Kid" Wolfe - The Cyber Boxing Zone Encyclopedia

Boxers from Cleveland
Super-bantamweight boxers
Jewish American boxers
Jewish boxers
American people of Russian-Jewish descent
1895 births
1975 deaths
American male boxers
20th-century American Jews